Emiliano José Contreras Tivani (born 1 July 1994) is an Argentinian professional racing cyclist, who currently rides for UCI Continental team .

Major results
2011
 2nd Road race, National Junior Road Championships
2012
 3rd Time trial, National Junior Road Championships
2015
 National Under-23 Road Championships
1st  Road race
1st  Time trial
 Pan American Under-23 Road Championships
8th Road race
8th Time trial
2016
 1st  Time trial, National Under-23 Road Championships
 1st Stage 2 Vuelta a Mendoza
 1st Prologue (TTT) Giro del Sol San Juan
 7th Time trial, Pan American Under-23 Road Championships
2019
 3rd Overall Giro del Sol San Juan
2022
 1st  Road race, Pan American Road Championships
 1st  Road race, National Road Championships

References

External links

Living people
1994 births
Argentine male cyclists
People from San Juan, Argentina
Sportspeople from San Juan Province, Argentina